Jora 10 Numbaria is a 2017 Punjabi  film written and directed by Amardeep Singh Gill.

Plot
A traumatic childhood and a corrupt justice system push a young man to become a ruthless gangster.

Cast
Dharmendra as Jagga Baba
Deep Sidhu as Jora 
Mukul Dev as Shera
Mukesh Tiwari as Sultan Ahmed Qureshi
Hobby Dhaliwal as Teja Aulakh
Rahul Sharma as Teja's Driver
Rohit Sharma as Pallavi's Brother
Gaurav Rana as Harish Producer
Sardar Sohi as Police officer

Sequel
Jora: The second chapter was released on 6 March 2020.

Soundtrack

Release
The film released  in India on September 1, 2017 .

Awards and nominations

See also
Ramta Jogi

References

External links
 
 

2017 films
Films about criminals
Films about organised crime in India
Films set in Punjab, India
Films scored by Sachin Ahuja
Punjabi-language Indian films
2010s Punjabi-language films